The Büttner Crazy Flyer (also called the Crazy Flier) is a family of one and two-seat German powered parachutes designed and produced by Büttner Propeller of Obernkirchen. The aircraft are supplied  complete and ready-to-fly, but without wings.

Design and development
The Crazy Flyer 2 features two-seats-in-tandem accommodation, tricycle landing gear and a single  Hirth 2704 engine in pusher configuration.

The aircraft carriage is built from triangulated bolted aluminium tubing. The main landing gear incorporates spring rod suspension. A variety of parachute-style wings from different manufacturers can be used.

Variants
Crazy Flyer 1
Single seat version powered by a Hirth F33  motor
Crazy Flyer 2
Two seat version powered by a Hirth 2704  motor

Specifications (Crazy Flyer 2)

References

External links

Crazy Flyer
2000s German sport aircraft
2000s German ultralight aircraft
Single-engined pusher aircraft
Powered parachutes